Hum Saath-Saath Hain is a 1999 Indian Hindi-language family drama film written and directed by Sooraj Barjatya under the production and distribution of Rajshri Productions. The film stars Salman Khan, Karisma Kapoor, Saif Ali Khan, Tabu, Sonali Bendre, Mohnish Bahl, Mahesh Thakur, and Neelam. The story centers on a joint family and its values and togetherness, who grow apart after a misunderstanding.

Hum Saath Saath Hain is the third film to feature Salman Khan with Rajshri Productions. Raamlaxman composed its music while Dev Kohli wrote the lyrics. Principal photography took place in Mumbai and various locations in Rajasthan. It received predominantly positive reviews from critics. It was also the first Bollywood film to be played in Canadian theatres, with six screenings in Toronto.

Salman Khan's performance earned him Best Actor nomination at the Zee Cine Awards held in 2000.
Mohnish Behl received a Best Supporting Actor nomination at the 45th Filmfare Awards.
The film was also dubbed into Telugu and released with the title  Premãnurãgam.

Plot
In the past Ramkishan Chaturvedi, a rich businessman loses his first wife Lakshmi sadly. They have a 1-year-old son Vivek. Ramkishan remarries the kind Mamta, and Vivek also accepts and respects her as his own mother. Later the two have three kids: Prem, Sangita and Vinod.

7 years later

While trying to save Prem and Vinod from a probable accident, Vivek is injured leaving him handicapped due to his right hand paralysis.

19 years later

Prem returns from US after completing his studies. Sangita lives with her husband Anand and daughter Radhika. Vinod is busy in studies. Vivek is still in treatment for his hand. On Ramkishan and Mamta's anniversary function, the four siblings wish them with respect.

Seeing Vivek's love for them, Ramkishan's business associate Adarsh's daughter Sadhna likes him at first sight. Adarsh sends a wedding proposal for her. Vivek agrees and marries Sadhna. Vinod is secretly in love with Sapna (daughter of Ramkishan's colleague Dharamraj Bajpai).

They show the love of Prem and Preeti (daughter of Ramkishan's friend Pritam). Everyone agrees to engage them. Eventually, Prem and Preeti find out about Vinod and Sapna who get engaged too. Ramkishan makes Vivek the managing director of his company.

A bitter turn comes when Anand's brother Anurag cheats on him from inheritance and share in the family business. This incident triggers insecurity in Mamta's mind. Meanwhile, her three friends and Dharamraj fill her head with thoughts as to why Vivek should be in charge of the family inheritance. This makes Mamta very paranoid.

She questions Ramkishan's decision, and wants division of the business equally between all sons. He disagrees as it will divide the family. Heartbroken after finding out, Vivek 
asks Ramkishan to put Prem in charge of family empire and moves back to their ancestral village Rampur with Sadhna. Vinod accompanies them.

Prem refuses to replace Vivek as head of the family. Vivek convinces him to go along with plan in the interest of preventing further conflict within the family. Prem tells Mamta that he won't marry and can't replace Vivek if she wants so. Eventually, Anurag realizes his mistake and unites with Anand.

Sangita asks Mamta to bring back Vivek. Mamta realizes her mistakes and visits Rampur with Ramkishan. In the hospital, Sadhna delivers a boy. Later, Prem and Vinod marry Preeti and Sapna. Dharamraj apologises realising ill-manner cannot end the love in family. All live happily ever after.

Cast 

 Mohnish Bahl as Vivek Chaturvedi
 Tabu as Sadhna Sharma
 Salman Khan as Prem Chaturvedi
 Sonali Bendre as Dr. Preeti Shukla
 Saif Ali Khan as Vinod Chaturvedi
 Karisma Kapoor as Sapna Bajpai
 Reema Lagoo as Mamta Awasthi
 Alok Nath as Ramkishan Chaturvedi
 Neelam as Sangita Chaturvedi
 Mahesh Thakur as Anand Pandey
 Shakti Kapoor as Anwar Khan
 Satish Shah as Pritam Shukla
 Sadashiv Amrapurkar as Dharamraj Bajpai
 Rajiv Verma as Adarsh Sharma
 Ajit Vachani as Lawyer Pranab Awasthi
 Himani Shivpuri as Neenakshi Awasthi
 Shammi as Durga Devi
 Dilip Dhawan as Anurag Pandey
 Sheela Sharma as Jyoti
 Kunika as Shanti Goel
 Jayshree T. as Krishna Verma
 Kalpana Iyer as Shobha Gupta
 Huma Khan as Rehana Baig
 Jatin Kanakia as Dr. Rajiv Sen
 Dinesh Hingoo as Raghuveer Singh
 Zoya Afroz as Radhika Pandey
 Achyut Potdar as Asif Ali Baig
 Zaki Mukaddam as Rajeev "Raju" Pandey
 Hardik Tanna as Aditya "Bablu" Pandey

Production

Casting

Salman Khan, Mohnish Bahl, Reema Lagoo, Alok Nath, Himani Shivpuri, Satish Shah and Ajit Vachani who all were part of Barjatya's Hum Aapke Hain Koun..! were cast in this film. Among this Salman, Lagoo, Nath, Bahl and Vachani appeared in Barjatya's Maine Pyar Kiya too.

While discussing Bahl's role, it was first offered to Anil Kapoor and Rishi Kapoor but upon their refusal Bahl was cast to play Vivek and prepared it by making a habit of keeping right hand in pocket accordingly the role.

Barjatya initially approached Madhuri Dixit for Sadhna's role, who played the lead actress in Hum Aapke Hain Koun..! but declined owing to her popularity, and then Manisha Koirala got the offer; even she was unable to take it due to filming for Mann, before Tabu was chosen.

Later, the makers talked with Rishi Kapoor again for Anand's role, but his refusal came again as did by Nitish Bhardwaj when offered too, and thus Mahesh Thakur was roped in.

Filming
The maximum principal photography of the film was done in Film City, Mumbai, and left portions were shot in Jodhpur, Rajasthan like the song "Mhare Hiwade Mein Naache Mor".

During the Jodhpur film schedule, some members of the cast, Salman Khan, Saif Ali Khan, Neelam Kothari, Tabu, and Sonali Bendre, were involved in a case of shooting of an endangered black buck on a hunting expedition.
The incident generated significant press coverage, and Salman Khan spent a week in Jodhpur jail in 2007, before the court granted him bail.
In 2018, the Jodhpur court convicted him and acquitted the others.

Release

Hum Saath-Saath Hain had released earlier but the music director Raamlaxman took time to check the soundtrack album for second time to not suffer any mistake. Following all work including post-production, cinematography, choreography and other things was completed followed by promotions, Hum Saath-Saath Hain finally hit the theatre screens on 5 November 1999 during Diwali.

Music
Raamlaxman composed the music, teaming up with Sooraj Barjatya for the third time. The soundtrack features seven songs and playback singers Kavita Krishnamurthy (as Sapna), Kumar Sanu (as Prem), Alka Yagnik (as Preeti), Udit Narayan (as Vinod), Anuradha Paudwal (as Sadhna), Hariharan (as Vivek), Sonu Nigam (as Anwar), Hema Sardesai (as Sangita), and Roop Kumar Rathod (as Pranab). Raamlaxman plagiarised his track "A B C D" from the Spanish singer Jeanette's 1974 song "Porque te vas". Savera R Someshwar of Rediff said that "..It is definitely time for Barjatya to look out for a new music director. Even the lyrics – barring "Maare hidwa ma naache mor" and "Mayya yashoda" – are banal...".

Awards and nominations

References

External links 
 
 
 
 Rajshri Productions: Hum Saath Saath Hain 

1999 films
1990s Hindi-language films
1999 romantic drama films
Films set in Rajasthan
Films shot in Rajasthan
Indian romantic drama films
Rajshri Productions films
Films scored by Raamlaxman
Films directed by Sooraj Barjatya